The Utica City School District is a public school district coterminous with the city of Utica, New York, United States. It is a highly diverse urban district, having 69% racial minority students and 17% students who are English language learners in 2017. It is part of Oneida-Herkimer-Madison BOCES and the Conference of Big 5 School Districts, a conference of the largest urban school districts in New York State.

History
The Utica City School District was party to the case Maisto v. State of New York, also called the "small cities" case, with seven other districts in the state. This suit alleged that the state's Foundation Aid formula, which was initiated in 2007 but frozen in the 2009–10 legislative session and cut in the 2010–2011 session, did not provide adequate funding to provide a basic education to students in these districts. In 2021, on appeal, the Supreme Court of New York ordered the state to revise its funding to adequately provide for these districts. State aid accounted for about 80% of the Utica City School District budget in 2021.

In 2013 the Utica Academy of Science charter school, run by the same group as the Syracuse Academy of Science, was established. The UAS diverted a few million dollars in state funding from UCSD's budget. A second charter school was denied permission in part due to concerns over further reducing the UCSD budget.

In 2016, the border between the Utica City School District and New Hartford Central School District was identified by the non-profit EdBuild as the 12th most segregating school district border in the United States.

Refugee student lawsuit 
In 2015, the Utica City School District was the subject of two lawsuits pertaining to its treatment of refugee students. Both suits were the result of a statewide review of compliance with Plyler v. Doe, which prevents schools from asking about the immigration status of students. The first suit was filed by the New York Civil Liberties Union on behalf of six refugee students, and the second by the Attorney General of New York. Both suits alleged that refugee students older than 16 who were perceived to have poor language skills were denied enrollment at Proctor High School. They were instead diverted into weaker alternative programs that focused solely on English as a foreign language and did not lead to a diploma or adequately prepare for a high school equivalency exam. Students in these programs were allegedly segregated from other students and not allowed to mix with their peers for lunch or extracurricular activities.

These suits were settled in 2016. For the first suit, the district agreed to reach out to individual school-age refugees as well as refugee communities in Utica to notify them of their right to attend school. For the second suit, the district was required to revise its enrollment policies and hire internal and external compliance monitors. It also required the district to offer compensatory schooling for students whose admission was denied or delayed, and to raise the standards of future alternative programs. The district did not admit wrongdoing as part of the settlements.

Although Utica was the only district sued as a result of the state's review, a similar lawsuit was filed against the School District of Lancaster, Pennsylvania later in 2015, and similar incidents were reported elsewhere in the state and country.

Schools

Elementary
There are ten elementary schools in the district: Albany, Columbus, Conkling, General Herkimer, Hughes, Jefferson, Jones, Kernan, MLK (built in 1955), and Watson Williams (built in 1992).

Middle
The district's two middle schools are James H. Donovan Middle School, named for New York State Senator James H. Donovan, and John F. Kennedy Middle School, named after the former president.

High school
Constructed in 1934 as a Works Progress Administration project, Thomas R. Proctor High School is the district's only high school, with 200 full-time teachers and 2,600 students. Utica Free Academy closed in 1990.

Administration
The district superintendent is Bruce Karam, while the board of education consists of eight members.

See also

Notre Dame Junior Senior High School (Utica, New York), a private school in the district
List of school districts in New York

References

Education in Oneida County, New York
School District
School districts in New York (state)